Plana Baixa is a comarca in the province of Castellón, Valencian Community, Spain.

The main source of water for irrigation in the area is the Millars River.

Municipalities 
The comarca is composed of 20 municipalities, listed below with their populations at the 2001 and 2011 Censuses, and according to the latest official estimates:

References

 
Comarques of the Valencian Community
Geography of the Province of Castellón